{{DISPLAYTITLE:63 knot}}

In knot theory, the 63 knot is one of three prime knots with crossing number six, the others being the stevedore knot and the 62 knot. It is alternating, hyperbolic, and fully amphichiral.
It can be written as the braid word

Symmetry
Like the figure-eight knot, the 63 knot is fully amphichiral. This means that the 63 knot is amphichiral, meaning that it is indistinguishable from its own mirror image. In addition, it is also invertible, meaning that orienting the curve in either direction yields the same oriented knot.

Invariants
The Alexander polynomial of the 63 knot is

Conway polynomial is

Jones polynomial is

and the Kauffman polynomial is
 

The 63 knot is a hyperbolic knot, with its complement having a volume of approximately 5.69302.

References

Double torus knots and links